Schön! is an English-language fashion magazine, launched in June 2009, and currently based in London. It is a biannual publication and is available in print, as well as online, iPad and iPhone and for download on the magazine's website. The title in German means "beautiful."

According to its website, its goal is "showcasing a dynamic and diverse array of ideas and talent" in art and fashion. In a recent survey conducted by the magazine, its readership is 45% male, 55% female, and the median age is 28 years. 56% earn more than £125,000 ($189,300 USD) a year. The magazine was distributed in 2012 with 115,000 copies into 43 countries, and has recently arrived in China and Brazil.

Its Editor-in-Chief and Creative Director is Raoul Keil, its Fashion Editor is Huma Humayun, and its Online Editor is Kelsey Barnes.

History
Schön! began as an online magazine intended to showcase the work of the online creative community Nineteen74.com, a 2009 Official Webby Honoree. It reflected the community's global scale by featuring articles, photos and work from each of the continents from which members of the community hailed. In the first few issues, features and articles were organized in terms of their continent of origin, but as the online community grew, so did the scope of the magazine. More recently, the magazine has dropped such formatting.

The magazine has included models such as Andrej Pejic, Tony Ward, and Victoria's Secret Angel Alessandra Ambrosio. Celebrities such as Kathy Griffin, Ivana Baquero, and Maddie Ziegler have appeared in recent issues.

Issues
Schön! 1: Enlighten Your Senses, cover art - "Geometric Homicide" by Robert G. Bartholot
Schön! 2: Be Intoxicated, cover art - "Solweig" by Cyril Lagel
Schön! 3: Get Hypnotized, cover art - "Me" by Bruna Rotunno
Schön! 4: Be Thrilled, cover art - "The Six Continents" by Dimitris Theocharis
Schön! 5: Rock Your World, cover art - "Alessandra the Great" by Jannis Tsipoulanis
Schön! 6: Taste It, cover art - "Blink" by Dimitris Theocharis
Schön! 7: Get Addicted, cover art - "Loren" by Jannis Tsipoulanis
Schön! 8: Just a Dream?, cover art - "Wunderkinder" by Jannis Tsipoulanis
Schön! 9: Tony Ward, cover art - "Tony Ward" by Dimitris Theocharis
Schön! 10: More Future Please!, cover art - "Mrs. Indiana Jones" by Jannis Tsipoulanis
Schön! 11: Sparkle!, cover art - "Lightness of Being" by Chris Levine
Schön! 12: Let the Sun Shine, cover art - "Miami Bitch" by Dimitris Theocharis
Schön! 13: Lucky Thirteen, dual covers - "Flesh, Flags and Fatigues" by Tiziano Magni and "My Name is Neff - Garrett Neff" by Phillip Mueller
Schön! 14: Strike!, dual covers - "Allure" by Christos Karantzolas and "Undercover" by Matthew Lyn
Schön! 15: Sam Webb by Dimitris Theocharis and Daisy Lowe by Yuval Hen
Schön! 16: David Gandy by Dimitris Theocharis and Kat Cordts by Pierre Dal Corso
Schön! 17: Crystal Renn by Ellen von Unwerth
Schön! 18: Naomi Campbell by Ellen von Unwerth
Schön! 19: Isabeli Fontana by Gustavo Zylbersztajn
Schön! 20: The Future is Now, cover art - Tian Yi & Chrystal Copland by Christos Karantzolas
Schön! 21: #HOT, four covers - Cassandra Smith by Miguel Starcevich, Tony Ward by Paul Scala, Sean O'Pry by Jack Waterlot, Rihanna by Zoe McConnell
Schön! 22: Coco Rocha by Rayan Ayash
Schön! 23: Aline Weber by Tiziano Magni
Schön! 24: Gigi Hadid by Rayan Ayash
Schön! 25: Eva Doll by Rayan Ayash 
Schön! 26: Lucy Liu by Markus & Koala 
Schön! 27: Brooke Candy by Michael Flores & Nicola Formichetti
Schön! 28: Maddie Ziegler by Jack Waterlot & Coline Bach
Schön! 29: Iman by Tiziano Magni
Schön! 30: Iggy Azalea by Jacques Dequeker
Schön! 31: Elle Fanning by Floria Sigismondi
Schön! 32: Ajak Deng by Alexander Saladrigas
Schön! 33: Taja Feistner by Alexander Saladrigas
Schön! 34: Sophia Lilis by Elizaveta Porodina
Schön! 35: Rosalía (singer) by Vince Aung
Schön! 36: H.E.R by Oriana Layendecker
Schön! 37: Kristine Froseth by Nick Hudson (It is the magazine's tenth anniversary edition)

References

External links
 Official website

Biannual magazines published in the United Kingdom
Fashion magazines published in the United Kingdom
Online magazines published in the United Kingdom
Magazines published in London
Magazines established in 2009